KYRS, known as "Thin Air Community Radio", is a non-profit, non-commercial, full-power community radio station in Spokane, Washington (licensed to Medical Lake, Washington) at 88.1 MHz FM. The station has a translator, K222BG, at 92.3 FM, licensed to Dartford, Washington.

The station's owners originally launched a low-power, 100-watt operation in 2003 as KYRS-LP (now KVFS-LP). The low-power station was sold to new ownership as a condition of Thin Air Community Radio being licensed for the current full-power 6,800 watt effective radiated power station on November 4, 2011.

The station streams its content from its website.

The former KYRS-LP was the fourth community radio barnraising of the Prometheus Radio Project.

See also
List of community radio stations in the United States

References

External links
 
 
 
 Spokane Radio News
 Spokane Translator Association, operator of K222BG

Community radio stations in the United States
YRS
Radio stations established in 2011